Rajni Bakshi is a Mumbai-based freelance journalist and author. She writes about social and political movements in contemporary India. Rajni is the founder and curator of Ahimsa Conversations, an online platform for exploring the possibilities of nonviolence. https://www.youtube.com/channel/UC63Bx1fQYOkCEom93k4T2tg

She was formerly the Gandhi Peace Fellow at Gateway House: Indian Council on Global Relations. 
Her journalism has appeared in many English and Hindi newspapers and magazines. Bakshi attended school in Kingston, Jamaica, Indraprastha College (Delhi), George Washington University (Washington D.C.) and Rajasthan University (Jaipur).

In 2000 Rajni received the Homi Bhabha Fellowship. Her book Bazaars, Conversations and Freedom (2009) won two Vodafone Crossword Book Awards, one in the "Non Fiction" category, and one in the "Popular Award" category.

Works
The Long Haul: The Bombay Textile Workers Strike of 1982-83 (1986; Great Bombay Textile Strike)
The Dispute Over Swami Vivekananda's Legacy (1993; Swami Vivekananda)
Bapu Kuti: Journeys in Rediscovery of Gandhi (1998)
LETS Make it Happen: Alternative Economics (2003)
An Economics for Well-Being (2003)
Bazaars, Conversations and Freedom (2009)

Notes

External links
Bazaars, Conversations and Freedom, official website
Review of Bazaars, Conversations and Freedom
Rajni Bakshi, Author at Gateway House 

Living people
Anti-consumerists
Gandhians
Women writers from Maharashtra
Writers from Mumbai
Indraprastha College for Women alumni
Year of birth missing (living people)
George Washington University alumni
University of Rajasthan alumni
Indian women journalists
Indian women political writers
Indian political writers
21st-century Indian women writers
21st-century Indian writers
21st-century Indian journalists
Indian social sciences writers
Indian women non-fiction writers